Salem Laoufi (born 7 January 1971) is an Algerian football manager.

References

1971 births
Living people
Algerian football managers
GC Mascara managers
JS Saoura managers
ASM Oran managers
USM El Harrach managers
Algerian Ligue Professionnelle 1 managers
21st-century Algerian people